Blackburn Nunatak is a prominent nunatak,  high, marking the north extremity of Rambo Nunataks in the Pensacola Mountains. It was mapped by the United States Geological Survey from surveys and from U.S. Navy air photos, 1956–66, and named by the Advisory Committee on Antarctic Names for Lieutenant Archie B. Blackburn, (MC) U.S. Navy, officer in charge at Plateau Station, winter 1967.

References
 

Nunataks of Queen Elizabeth Land